100 Films and a Funeral is both a memoir by Michael Kuhn and a 2007 documentary film adaptation by filmmaker Michael McNamara about the rise and fall of PolyGram Filmed Entertainment (PFE), the company that produced Four Weddings and a Funeral, The Usual Suspects, and Trainspotting. Kuhn headed PFE from 1991 till 1999, when Philips sold it to the Seagram conglomerate. The selling of PFE also ended the prominent role of the company in the British film industry revival of the 1990s.

Accolades

References

External links
 

2007 films
Canadian documentary films
2007 documentary films
Show business memoirs
Non-fiction books adapted into films
Films based on non-fiction books
Documentary films about the cinema of the United Kingdom
English-language books
2000s English-language films
2000s Canadian films
English-language documentary films